A Arnoia is a municipality in the province of Ourense in the Galicia region of north-west Spain. It is located to the west of the province, by the confluence of the río Arnoia and the río Miño.

See also  
 Río Arnoia

References  

Municipalities in the Province of Ourense